Gaudio is a surname. People with this surname include:

Bob Gaudio (born 1942), American singer
Bob Gaudio (American football) (1925–2003), American football player
Dino Gaudio (born 1957), American basketball coach
Eugene Gaudio (1886–1920), Italian-American cinematographer and brother of Tony
Gastón Gaudio (born 1978), Argentine tennis player
Ivan Sergei Gaudio (born 1971), American actor
Natália Gaudio (born 1992), Brazilian gymnast
Tony Gaudio (1883–1951), Italian-American cinematographer and brother of Eugene

Italian-language surnames